Çalağan-Güney is a village in the Lachin District of Azerbaijan. The Battle of Chalagan was fought here in 1412.

References 

Villages in Azerbaijan
Populated places in Lachin District